Scartaglen or Scartaglin is a village and townland in the Sliabh Luachra area of County Kerry, Ireland. It is located on the R577 regional road, close to the town of Castleisland. As of the 2011 census, the townland of Scartaglin had a population of 163 people. 

The local Roman Catholic church is dedicated to Our Lady of Lourdes and was built between 1928 and 1930. Scartaglin National School is a co-educational primary (national) school which had over 120 pupils enrolled as of the 2020 school year. The local Gaelic Athletic Association club, Scartaglin GAA, fields teams in the East Kerry Division.

See also
 World Fiddle Day

References

Towns and villages in County Kerry